Umar Lubis (born July 14, 1973 in Jakarta) is an Indonesian actor. He is known for his numerous roles in soap operas. He always role in SinemArt soap opera. Usually he always role as father in soap opera. He is son in-law from Rae Sita. His name started to be known by public when he play in soap opera Intan. In that soap opera, he roled as Dr. Frans, father of Lila who is roled by Ingka Noverita.

Personal life 
Umar married  Ravelra Ruth Supit (October 14, 1975) in 1996. From their marriage, they have four children, there are Nabil Raehan Lubis (January 1997), Ramzie Rif'at Lubis (July 7, 1998), Rania Rizqina Lubis (July 24, 2002), and Raafi Ali Lubis (April 2011).

Filmography

Films

Soap Operas

TVM 
 Kupilih Jalanku Sendiri (2017) as Akmal Fatoni

References

External links 
 

1973 births
Living people
People from Jakarta
Indonesian male actors
Indonesian people of Egyptian descent